Dickens is an English surname originating from the name Dick, the diminutive of Richard, stemmed with the patronymic termination ens, meaning belonging to, or the son of. Notable people with the surname include:

Charles Dickens family/descendants  

 John Dickens (1785–1851), the father of novelist Charles Dickens 
 Charles Dickens (1812–1870), British novelist of the Victorian era
 Catherine Dickens (1815–1879), estranged wife of Charles Dickens
 Frederick Dickens (1820–1868), younger brother of Charles Dickens
 Alfred Lamert Dickens (1822–1860), younger brother of Charles Dickens
 Augustus Dickens (1827–1866), younger brother of Charles Dickens
 Charles Dickens Jr. (1837–1896), editor and writer, first child of Charles Dickens
 Mary Dickens (1838–1896) oldest daughter of Charles Dickens
 Kate Dickens (1839–1929), second daughter of Charles Dickens and an artist
 Walter Landor Dickens (1841–1863) son of Charles Dickens
 Francis Dickens (1844–1886), member of the Royal Canadian Mounted Police, third son of Charles Dickens
 Alfred D'Orsay Tennyson Dickens (1845–1912), son of Charles Dickens and a lecturer on his father's life
 Sydney Smith Haldimand Dickens (1847–1872) son of Charles Dickens and a Royal Navy officer
 Henry Fielding Dickens (1849–1933), son of Charles Dickens and a King's Counsel and barrister
 Dora Annie Dickens, (1850–1851) youngest daughter of Charles Dickens
 Edward Dickens (1852–1902) youngest child of Charles Dickens
 Gerald Charles Dickens (1879–1962), grandson of Charles Dickens and an Admiral in the Royal Navy
 Monica Dickens (1915–1992), British writer, great-granddaughter of Charles Dickens
 Cedric Charles Dickens (1916–2006), great grandson of Charles Dickens and steward of his literary legacy
 Peter Gerald Charles Dickens (1917–1987), great grandson of Charles Dickens and a Captain in the Royal Navy
 Gerald Charles Dickens (actor) (born 1963), great great grandson of Charles Dickens and an actor and performer

Writers 

 Charles Dickens (1812–1870), British novelist of the Victorian era
 A. G. Dickens (1910–2001), British academic and author about English Reformation
 Monica Dickens (1915–1992), British writer, great-granddaughter of Charles Dickens
 Frank Dickens (1932–2016), British cartoonist, creator of the comic strip "Bristow"

Sports

 Ernie Dickens (1921–1985), Canadian hockey defenceman
 Stanley Dickens (born 1952), Swedish race-car driver
 Alan Dickens (born 1964), British football midfielder
 Alan Dickens (rugby player) (born 1978), British rugby union player
 Peggy Dickens (born 1975), French slalom canoer
 Kaniel Dickens (born 1978), U.S. basketball player
 Scott Dickens (born 1984), Canadian swimmer
 Phil Dickens (20th century), U.S. head football coach of Indiana University
 Jemondre Dickens (born 1998), South African soccer player

Politicians, governmental, official

 Samuel Dickens (?–1840), U.S. politician, Congressional Representative from North Carolina
 Francis Dickens (1844–1886), British mounted policeman, third son of Charles Dickens
 Geoffrey Dickens (1931–1995), British Conservative politician
 James Dickens (1931–2013), Labour MP
 Inez Dickens (20th century), U.S. member of the New York City Council
 David Dickens (20th century), former director of the Centre for Strategic Studies New Zealand

Music

 Little Jimmy Dickens (1920–2015), James Cecil Dickens, U.S. country music singer
 Hazel Dickens (born 1935), U.S. bluegrass singer
 Andy Dickens (born 1953), British  jazz trumpeter, singer, and bandleader

Actors

 Matthew Dickens (1961–2013), American actor
 Kim Dickens (born 1965), U.S. actress

Arts

 Archie Dickens (1907–2004), British pin-up artist

Scientists

 Gerald R. Dickens, Professor of Earth Science at Rice University

Fictional characters

 Eddie Dickens, lead character in several books by British author Philip Ardagh

English-language surnames
Patronymic surnames
Surnames from given names